The Ethiopia national badminton team represents Ethiopia in international badminton team competitions. It is controlled by the Ethiopian Badminton Federation, the governing body for Ethiopian badminton. The national team has competed in the All Africa Men's and Women's Team Badminton Championships.

The Ethiopian mixed team also competed in the African Games.

Participation in African Badminton Championships
The Ethiopian men's and women's team qualified for the 2012 All Africa Men's and Women's Team Badminton Championships (previously named Thomas & Uber Cups Preliminaries for Africa) after becoming the host nation of the tournament. Both men's and women's team were eliminated in the group stage.

Men's team

Women's team

Participation in Africa Games 
The Ethiopian mixed team competed in the African Games. They have yet to win a medal in badminton at the Games.

Current squad 

Men
Endale Teklu
Fanthhun Estefanos
Asnake Getachew Sahilu
Surafel Yakob

Women
Kedusan Admasu Boke
Mekides Meskale Gudro
Belete Melat
Yerusksew Legssey

References

Badminton
National badminton teams
Badminton in Ethiopia